The Soviet RPG-22 Netto is a one-shot disposable anti-tank rocket launcher first deployed in 1985, based on the RPG-18 rocket launcher, but firing a larger 72.5 mm fin stabilised projectile. The weapon fires an unguided projectile, can be prepared to fire in around 10 seconds, and can penetrate 400 mm of armour, 1.2 metres of brick or 1 metre of reinforced concrete.

Operation

The smoothbore container is made from two fibreglass parts; a main tube containing the rocket, and a telescoping forward extension, which slides over the barrel.

In transport mode, both ends of the barrel are closed by plastic covers, which open when the weapon is extended. The firing mechanism is manually cocked by raising the rear sight. Lowering the rear sight de-cocks the weapon if there is no target.

On firing, there is a backblast danger area behind the weapon, of at least 15 metres. The solid propellant motor completely burns out while the rocket is still in the barrel tube, accelerating it to about 133 metres per second. The weapon has simple pop-up sights graduated to ranges of 50, 150 and 250 metres.

To keep training costs down, a reusable RPG-22 is available that fires a 30 mm subcalibre projectile, weighing 350g, to operational ranges. Handling is identical to that of the full calibre version, with the exception of the discharge noise and backblast.

Use
On the evening of 20 September 2000, the MI6 Building in London (the headquarters of the British Secret Intelligence Service) was attacked by unapprehended forces using an RPG-22 anti-tank rocket, causing superficial damage.

A weapons cache destined for the Real IRA, seized in Croatia in August 2000, contained a number of RPG-22s. Prices range from £150 to £220 per launcher. The one used against the MI6 building was Russian-made, while the one found at Dungannon came from Bulgaria.

Operators

Current operators
  – Russian Federation Army
  – Bulgarian Army, local production at VMZ Sopot.
  – Colombian National Army
  – Croatian Army
  – Georgian Army
  – Indian Army
 : Iraqi insurgents
  – Moldovan Army
  – Peruvian Army
 
  – Turkmenistan Army
  – Ukrainian Army, Ukrainian National Guard.

Former operators
  Soviet Union, passed on to successor states
  People's Republic of Bulgaria

See also
 M72 LAW
 M80 Zolja
 PF-89
 Kestrel (rocket launcher)

References

Reference in Print

 Jones, Richard. Jane's Infantry Weapons 2005–06. Coulsdon: Jane's, 2005. .

Cold War anti-tank rockets of the Soviet Union
Modern anti-tank rockets of Russia
Military equipment introduced in the 1980s